Acrocercops nebropa is a moth of the family Gracillariidae, known from Samoa. It was described by Edward Meyrick in 1932.

References

nebropa
Moths of Oceania
Moths described in 1927